The 2021 Sun Belt Conference women's soccer tournament was the postseason women's soccer tournament for the Sun Belt Conference held from November 1 to November 7, 2021. The ten-match tournament took place at the Foley Sports Complex in Foley, Alabama. The eleven-team single-elimination tournament consisted of four rounds based on seeding from regular season conference play. The defending champions were the South Alabama Jaguars.  South Alabama successfully defended their title with a 1–0 championship game win over Georgia Southern in the final. This was the eighth Sun Belt women's soccer tournament title for the South Alabama women's soccer program and the fourth for head coach Richard Moodie. Eight of the last nine Sun Belt Women's Soccer Tournaments have been won by South Alabama. As tournament champions, South Alabama earned the Sun Belt's automatic berth into the 2021 NCAA Division I Women's Soccer Tournament.

Seeding 

All eleven teams in the Sun Belt Conference participated in the 2021 Tournament. Seeding was based on regular season conference record. A tiebreaker was required to determine the fifth and sixth seeds of the tournament as Coastal Carolina and Texas State both finished with 4–5–1 conference records. Coastal Carolina was awarded the fifth seed and Texas State earned the sixth seed. It is unclear why this was the case as Texas State defeated Coastal Carolina on September 16. A tiebreaker was also required to determine the eighth and ninth seeds as Louisiana–Monroe and Troy finished with identical 4–6–0 regular season records. Troy defeated Louisiana-Monroe on October 28, but was awarded the ninth seed and Louisiana-Monroe was given the eight seed in the tournament.

Bracket

Source:

Schedule

First round

Quarterfinals

Semifinals

Final

Statistics

Goalscorers

All-Tournament team

Source:

MVP in bold

References 

Sun Belt Conference Women's Soccer Tournament
2021 Sun Belt Conference women's soccer season
Women's sports in Alabama